Sekolah Menengah Kebangsaan Taman SEA is a secondary school situated in Petaling Jaya in Selangor, Malaysia. It is located between residential areas Kampung Tunku, SS2 and SEA Park.

History
Construction began in 1975. It started with five classes per form. The school has 1700 students.

School identity

School emblem

 Yellow symbolises loyalty,
 Triangle-shaped badge emphasises the unity in SMKTS,
 See, Evaluate, Act, is the school's motto.
 The tiger symbolises strength.
 The rose symbolises love.

School anthem
SMKTS anthem music score 
The school anthem was written by Peter Kannu and Ann Ong.
Awas nilai bertindak
Pegangan yang disanjung tinggi
Di sinilah inspirasi kita bertapak
Belajar berusaha dan berjasa
Sekolah Menengah Taman S.E.A.
Sekolah yang ku cintai
Putera-puteri diajar berbakti
Hidup tetap aman dan abadi
Taat setia dan amanah
Teladan yang berfaedah ini
Berganding bahu bekerjasama
Untuk nusa dan Negara
Literal translation
See evaluate act
The motto that we obey
Its here where we're inspired
Study strive and contribute
Seapark High School
The school I love
Sons and daughters are taught well
Live a peaceful life forever
Obedient, loyal and trustful
Our great role models
Side by side we work together
For our homeland and nation

Principals
 1976 – 1977: En David Koay
 1978 – 1979: En Victor Wong
 1980 – 1982: En Hooi Weng Fatt
 1982 – 1984: Cik Marie Jeannie Low
 1984 – 1985: En Abd Hadi bin Alias
 1985 – 1987: En Harbajan Singh Sidhu
 1987 – 1989: En Rusli bin Rasyikin
 1989 – 1991: Tn Hj Mohd Hashim bin Zakaria
 1992 – 1997: Pn Hjh Saleha bt Othman
 1997 – 2005: Pn Hjh Fatimah bt Hj Ibrahim
 2005 – 2009: Pn Zakiyah bt Daie
 2010 - 2013: Pn Hjh Siti Masrah bt Napiah
 2013 - 2015: Datin Hjh Zuraidah bt Hj Mohamad
 2015 - 2020: Pn. Suryani Binti Ismail
 2020–present: Pn. Rossheta Binti Abd. Rahman

School magazine
Titled Samudra it has been published since 1977.

Structures
SMK Taman SEA has five blocks of buildings. A new workshop is under construction.

Higher education
Although students can get Form 6 education, the majority of the students graduating will attend colleges like Taylors, Sunway, Help or TARC, or pursue further studies at local matriculation centres.

Achievements
The school won the National Robotics Competition in 2007.

References

External links
 
SMKTS Alumni @ Facebook

Schools in Selangor
Secondary schools in Malaysia